DJ Dale (born October 30, 2000) is an American football defensive tackle who currently plays for the Alabama Crimson Tide.

Early life and high school
Dale grew up in Birmingham, Alabama and attended Clay-Chalkville High School. Dale committed to play college football at Alabama over an offer from Auburn.

College career
Dale was named Alabama's starting nose tackle going into his freshman season. He finished the season with 17 tackles, three tackles for loss, one sack and one quarterback hurry. As a sophomore, he had 22 tackles, one tackle for loss, two pass breakups, and one fumble recovery. Dale had 18 tackles with four tackles for loss and two sacks in his junior season.

References

External links 
 Alabama Crimson Tide bio

2000 births
Living people
American football defensive tackles
Players of American football from Alabama
Alabama Crimson Tide football players